Rebecca Bresee is a computer animator at Disney. Becky Bresee joined Disney in 1996 and has worked on movies such as Tangled, Wreck-It Ralph, Big Hero Six, Zootopia, Frozen and Frozen 2, and Moana.  She has worked at Disney for 24 years. Bresee is most known for working on Disney's Frozen.

Work on Frozen
Rebecca Bresee worked as supervising animator for Frozen before moving on to become Head of Animation for Frozen II, but is said to have paid special attention to the character Anna in both of her roles working for the films. Frozen II was the first film Bresee was the Head of Animation for, and when asked about the film she responded, "I am nervously excited. Part of it speaks to me very personally. I hold tight to it, because I love it so much, and I hope other people love it, too." In "The Story of Frozen: Making a Disney Animated Classic," Bresee is noted as a supervising animator for Anna, and is said to have based the movements for Anna off of real-life videos she took of herself and her children. This was to give Anna a life-like quality that would appear in the animation. In doing so, the character of Anna was distinctly separate from other characters created for the same movie, creating an 'optimistic' and 'fearless' Anna. Later, for Frozen II, Bresee would become Head of Animation. This gave her additional responsibilities such as overseeing the animation for the movie, working on additional characters, and managing the rest of the animation team.

When asked about Frozen II, Bresee responded with, "It's an evolution and an expansion of the story of Frozen, and many of the questions raised in the first movie become the mysteries that our gang are trying to solve in this film." Bresee worked alongside Tony Smeed as Head of Animation to help recreate the iconic characters of Anna and Elsa. Given that Bresee had been involved heavily with Anna's character in the previous film, she was able to continue this work into the next.

Biography

Rebecca Bresee was born in Miami, Florida, alongside her twin sister. She grew up in Miami, Florida but moved to Oneonta when she was ten years old. She graduated from Oneonta High School, took animation classes at Sheridan College, and graduated from SUNY Geneseo in 1993 before moving on to work at Disney.

She has two daughters and a husband. Bresee has worked at Disney since 1996.

Works 

 Dinosaur
Treasure Planet
Chicken Little
Meet the Robinsons
 Bolt
Tangled
Wreck-It Ralph
Big Hero 6
Zootopia
Frozen
Frozen II
Moana

References

Year of birth missing (living people)
Living people
American animators
American women animators
Walt Disney Animation Studios people
State University of New York at Geneseo alumni